is a hotel situated directly above Namba Station on the Nankai Railway lines in Chūō-ku, Osaka, Japan. The hotel is owned by Nankai Electric Railway Co., Ltd., and managed by the Switzerland-based hotel chain Swissôtel Hotels & Resorts.

History  

In 2003, Raffles Hotels and Resorts signed a deal with Nankai Electric Railway to operate the Nankai South Tower Hotel. As a result of this deal, the property's name was changed to Swissôtel Nankai Osaka, and it became the first Swissôtel Hotels and Resorts property in Japan. Swissôtel Nankai Osaka commemorated its 10th anniversary in 2013. 

In 2016, AccorHotels acquired FRHI Hotels & Resorts, Swissôtel Nankai Osaka become the upper and luxury tier property of AccorHotels in Japan.

References

Hotels in Osaka
Skyscrapers in Osaka
Accor hotels
Railway hotels
Skyscraper hotels in Japan
Japan–Switzerland relations
Hotels established in 1990
Hotel buildings completed in 1990